John Laughrey (born 1784) was the fourth mayor of Columbus, Ohio.   He served Columbus for one term.  His successor was William T. Martin.

References

Bibliography

External links
John Laughrey at Political Graveyard

Mayors of Columbus, Ohio
1784 births
Year of death missing